Sami-Jussi Saari (born 21 January 1962) is a Finnish soul musician. To date, Saari has released six solo studio albums, after having previously been part of such groups as Veeti & the Velvets, Aki Sirkesalo ja Lemmen jättiläiset and Sami Saari & Cosmosonic. Saari has often been labelled as the "King of Finnish Soul", but he has also worked with pop, rock and rap musicians such as Anna Puu, Elastinen and Cheek.

Selected discography

Solo albums

Singles

References

Living people
Finnish male musicians
1962 births
Finnish soul singers